Terinebrica triplex is a species of moth of the family Tortricidae, they are found in São Paulo, Brazil.

References

Moths described in 2001
Euliini